Oskar Tietz (18 October 1895 – 16 May 1975) was a German racing cyclist. He rode in the 1930 Tour de France.

References

External links
 

1895 births
1975 deaths
German male cyclists
Place of birth missing
Cyclists from Berlin